The 1966 St Kilda Football Club season is the most successful season in St Kilda Football Club history. It currently stands as the only premiership season for St Kilda since its entry into the VFL. The Saints season in 1966 also saw St Kilda win every home game, including the Grand Final rematch in round 8.

Although 1966 was St Kilda's first premiership season, the club had been to the VFL Grand Final in 1913 and more recently, 1965. Leading up to the premiership season, St Kilda had played finals football in both the 1961 and 1963 seasons.

Season summary

Fixture

Ladder

Notes

Sources

External links
1966 VFL Grand Final on YouTube
 of the St Kilda Football Club

1966